Suzanne Gitzi is a Canadian female country music singer. In 1993, Gitzi released her debut album, Fallen Angel, which featured four singles that charted on the Canadian RPM Country Tracks. Her second album, 1996's Dressed in Black, featured her highest charting single, "Judge and Jury", which reached a peak of number 35 in March 1996. A self-titled album was released in 1997.

Discography

Albums

Singles

Guest singles

Music videos

References

Canadian women country singers
Living people
Year of birth missing (living people)